Johannes Piscator (27 March 1546 – 26 July 1625) was a German Reformed theologian, known as a Bible translator and textbook writer.

He was a prolific writer, and initially moved around as he held a number of positions. Some scholarly confusion as to whether there was more than one person of the name was addressed in a paper by Walter Ong.

Life

Piscator was born at Strasbourg, and educated at the University of Tübingen. He became professor of theology at Strasbourg in 1573. Elector Frederick III experienced some resistance when he attempted to appoint him to the arts faculty at the University of Heidelberg in 1574, and Piscator eventually took a post at the preparatory Latin Paedagogium in Heidelberg.

After a confessional change in Heidelberg, he briefly served as deputy rector at the court school in Dillenburg in 1577 before being appointed professor of theology at the Casimirianum in Neustadt in 1578. He later served as rector at Moers in 1581 before settling into a productive career as professor at the Herborn Academy, from 1584 to 1625, where he was able to advance his Ramist pedagogy fully. He died at Herborn.

Works

Piscator prepared Latin commentaries collectively of the New Testament (Herborn, 1595–1609) and the Old Testament (1612, 1618), and a German translation of the Bible (1605–19). He followed with Anhang des herbonischen biblischen Wercks (1610), noted for its wealth of archeological, historical, and theological material.

He left a multitude of text-books in philosophy, philology, and theology, of which Aphorismi doctrinæ christianæ (1596) was much used.

In 2010 Piscator's Appendix to his Commentary on Exodus 21 - 23 has been translated and published under the title of Disputations on the Judicial Laws of Moses.

Theologian

His significance for theology was his opposition to the doctrine of the active obedience of Christ. "Whoever denies that Christ was subject to the law, denies that he was man." If the imputation of the active obedience were sufficient man would be free from obedience as well as from the curse.

Notes

References
 
 F. C. Baur, Die christliche Lehre von der Versöhnung, pp. 352 sqq., Tübingen, 1838; 
 Dagmar Drüll, Heidelberger Gelehrtenlexikon 1386-1651, Berlin: Springer, 2002, pp. 455–456.
 W. Gass, Geschichte der protestantischen Dogmatik, i. 422 sqq., 4 vols., Berlin, 1854–67; 
 E. F. Karl Müller, "Johannes Piscator," in New Schaff-Herzog Encyclopedia of Religious Knowledge, Vol. 9
 A. Ritschl, Die christliche Lehre von der Rechtfertigung and Versöhnung, i. 271 sqq., Bonn, 1889, Eng. transl., Critical Hist. of the Christian Doctrine of Justification and Reconciliation, Edinburgh, 1872.
 Otto Renkhoff: Nassauische Biographie. Wiesbaden 1992. S. 613.
 Steubing, in ZHT, 1841, part 4, pp. 98 sqq.;

External links
 
 Works of Piscator in the Munich Digital Library
 Works of Piscator in the Post-Reformation Digital Library

1546 births
1625 deaths
16th-century German writers
16th-century German male writers
17th-century Calvinist and Reformed theologians
17th-century German Protestant theologians
17th-century German writers
17th-century German male writers
Arminian theologians
German Calvinist and Reformed theologians
German male non-fiction writers